Adam Dario Keel (16 November 1924 in Lugano – 21 May 2018) was a Swiss artist.

References

1924 births
2018 deaths
20th-century Swiss painters
Swiss male painters
21st-century Swiss painters
21st-century Swiss male artists
20th-century Swiss male artists
People from Lugano